Fuchstal is a municipality in the district of Landsberg in Bavaria in Germany. It consists of the three villages Leeder (administrative centre), Asch and Sesstall.

References

Landsberg (district)